The Praeneste fibula (the "brooch of Palestrina") is a golden fibula or brooch, today housed in the Pigorini National Museum of Prehistory and Ethnography in Rome.  The fibula bears an inscription in Old Latin, claiming craftsmanship by one Manios and ownership by one Numazios.  At the time of its discovery in the late nineteenth century, it was accepted as the earliest known specimen of the Latin language.  The authenticity of the inscription has since been disputed. However a new analysis performed in 2011 declared it to be genuine "beyond any reasonable doubt" and to date from the Orientalizing period, in the first half of the seventh century BC.

Discovery
The fibula was presented to the public in 1887 by Wolfgang Helbig, an archaeologist.

Date and inscription

The fibula was thought to originate from the 7th century BC.

The reconstructed Proto-Italic ancestor would have been:

The equivalent Classical Latin sentence obtained by applying the appropriate differences between Old Latin and Classical Latin would probably have been:

translated as:

Manius made me for Numasius

Hoax hypothesis
In 1980 Margherita Guarducci, a leading epigraphist, published a book arguing that the inscription had been forged by Francesco Martinetti, an art dealer, and Helbig, who were known to have collaborated in shady dealings. Guarducci argued that the fibula's presentation in 1887 was a hoax perpetrated to advance the careers of both men. This was the most formal but not the first accusation of its kind: Georg Karo had said that Helbig told him that the fibula had been stolen from Palestrina's Tomba Bernardini.

Subsequent arguments for authenticity 

Evidence in favor of the genuineness of the text came from a new Etruscan inscription of the Orientalizing period published by Massimo Poetto and Giulio Facchetti in 1999. The inscription scratched on the body of an Etrusco-Corinthian aryballos shows a gentilicium, Numasiana, which provides confirmation of the genuineness of the name Numasioi on the Fibula Prenestina, often regarded as suspicious by the supporters of the theory that it was a forgery.

In 2005, based on epigraphic and other arguments, linguist Markus Hartmann concluded that it is justified to assume the authenticity of the inscription as long as there is no compelling evidence for a forgery, and dated it with confidence to the seventh century BC.

In 2011, new scientific evidence was presented by the research team of Edilberto Formigli and Daniela Ferro, whose optical, physical and chemical analyses allowed them to take into consideration smaller scrapes on the surface of the object than was possible in the 1980s. Observation by means of scanning electron microscope (SEM) and detailed physical and chemical analyses on the surface of small areas within the track of the incision showed the existence of micro-crystallization of the gold surface: a natural phenomenon that could have taken place only in the course of centuries after the fusion. The study reported that a 19th-century forger could not have realized such a forgery.

However, the micro-crystallization discovery alone seems to still leave open the possibility that C. Densmore Curtis' impression, expressed in 1919, that "based on its stiff lines and awkward transitions, ... it did not come from the Bernardini Tomb, but is of a somewhat later date", could be correct.

Replicas
Replicas of the fibula are held by the National Roman Museum's Museum of Epigraphy at the Baths of Diocletian in Rome, and also by the Arthur M. Sackler Museum at Harvard in Cambridge, Massachusetts.

See also

 Duenos inscription
 Lapis Niger

References

Further reading
Authors who argue that the Fibula is a forgery:
 
 
 

Authors who argue that the Fibula is authentic:

External links

 

7th-century BC works
1887 archaeological discoveries
Archaeology of Italy
Forgery controversies
Gold objects
Individual brooches
Inscriptions of disputed origin
Latin inscriptions